Berkanush is a village in the Artashat Municipality of the Ararat Province of Armenia.

Gallery

References

External links 

 
 World Gazeteer: Armenia – World-Gazetteer.com
 Report of the results of the 2001 Armenian Census

Populated places in Ararat Province